Mount Haskell is a buttress-type mountain,  high, standing at the southwest side of Cabinet Inlet between Mount Denucé and Mount Holmes, on the east coast of Graham Land, Antarctica. It was charted in 1947 by the Falkland Islands Dependencies Survey, who named it for Daniel C. Haskell, the American bibliographer of the New York Public Library and author of the bibliography, The United States Exploring Expedition, 1838–42, and its Publications, 1844–1874.

References

Mountains of Graham Land
Foyn Coast